42 Aurigae is a star in the northern constellation of Auriga. The designation is from the star catalogue of English astronomer John Flamsteed, first published in 1712. It has an apparent visual magnitude of 6.53, which places it just below the visibility limit for normal eyesight under good seeing conditions. It displays an annual parallax shift of 13.24 mas, which yields a distance estimate of around 246 light years. The star is moving closer to the Sun with a radial velocity of −12 km/s. It is a member of the Ursa Major Moving Group of stars that share a common motion through space.

The star was assigned a stellar classification of F0 V by Nancy Roman in 1949, indicating it is an F-type main-sequence star. However, in 1995 Abt and Morrell catalogued it as class ; a somewhat hotter and more massive A-type main-sequence star that displays spectral peculiarities as well as nebulous lines brought about by rapid rotation. It is around a billion years old with a high rate of spin, showing a projected rotational velocity of 228 km/s. The star has an estimated 1.7 times the mass of the Sun and is radiating 10 times the Sun's luminosity from its photosphere at an effective temperature of around 7,660 K.

References

F-type main-sequence stars
A-type main-sequence stars
Ursa Major Moving Group
Auriga (constellation)
Durchmusterung objects
Aurigae, 42
043244
029884
2228